Alba was the name of a genetically modified "glowing" rabbit created as an artistic work by contemporary artist Eduardo Kac, produced in collaboration with French geneticist Louis-Marie Houdebine.

Houdebine used the GFP gene found in the jellyfish, Aequorea victoria, that fluoresces green when exposed to blue light. This is a protein used in many standard biological experiments involving fluorescence. When Alba was exposed to such light, she would literally glow green — though photos by Kac showing the entire organism, including its hair, glowing a uniform green have had their veracity challenged.

Eduardo Kac has described Alba as an animal that does not exist in nature. In an article published in The Boston Globe, Houdebine admitted creating Alba for Kac and stated that Alba has a 'particularly mellow and sweet disposition.' This article generated a global media scandal, which caused Houdebine to distance himself from Kac's work. All subsequent media articles present variations on Houdebine's disengagement effort.

Alba's lifespan is an open question. In 2002, a US reporter called INRA (France), where Houdebine works, and was told that Alba had died. The reporter published an article stating that Alba was dead but the only evidence she provided was to quote Houdebine as saying: "I was informed one day that bunny was dead without any reason. So, rabbits die often. It was about 4 years old, which is a normal lifespan in our facilities." 

In the 2007 European Molecular Biology Organization Members Meeting in Barcelona, Louis-Marie Houdebine presented in detail his version of the reality of 'The GFP rabbit story', placing emphasis on sensationalism by journalists and the TV media.

References

External links
Eduardo Kac's website
 Boston Globe article that started the Alba global scandal
Description of technology used to create Alba

Rabbits and hares in art
Individual rabbits
Contemporary works of art
Genetically modified organisms